The Clearing is a 2004 American thriller drama film and the directorial debut of film producer Pieter Jan Brugge. The film is loosely based on the real life kidnapping of Gerrit Jan Heijn that took place in the Netherlands in 1987. The screenplay was written by Justin Haythe.

Plot
Wayne Hayes (Robert Redford), and his wife Eileen (Helen Mirren) are living the American dream in a wealthy Pittsburgh suburb, having raised two children (Alessandro Nivola, Melissa Sagemiller) and built up a successful business from scratch. He is looking forward to a peaceful retirement with Eileen. Everything changes when Wayne is kidnapped in broad daylight by a former employee, Arnold Mack (Willem Dafoe). While Wayne tries negotiating with the kidnapper, Eileen works with the FBI to try to secure her husband's release. During the investigation, Eileen learns that Wayne has continued an extramarital affair that he promised to end months previously.

Eileen is eventually instructed to deliver the ransom to the kidnapper, but Arnold takes the money without returning her husband; Arnold murdered Wayne the day of the kidnapping. Eileen's ordeal takes place over the course of a week, but the film shows Wayne's kidnapping as if it were happening at the same time.

Authorities eventually catch Arnold when he starts spending the ransom money in the neighborhood where he lives. At a local grocery store, he uses a $100 bill for a purchase. The store manager calls to verify the serial number on the $100 bill is on a watch list the FBI distributed to local businesses. During questioning, police ask Arnold if he wanted to be caught, and he admits that the kidnapping was to get money for his depressed wife—but it took him all day to bring himself to kill Wayne and he could not live with the guilt of his crime. In the end, Eileen receives a loving note written by Wayne before his death.

Cast
 Robert Redford as Wayne Hayes
 Helen Mirren as Eileen Hayes
 Willem Dafoe as Arnold Mack
 Alessandro Nivola as Tim Hayes
 Matt Craven as FBI Agent Ray Fuller
 Melissa Sagemiller as Jill Hayes
 Wendy Crewson as Louise Miller
 Larry Pine as Tom Finch
 Diana Scarwid as Eva Finch

Locations
The film was shot in and around Asheville, North Carolina and in downtown Pittsburgh, Pennsylvania.

Reception 
The film has received mixed reviews. On Rotten Tomatoes, the film has an approval rating of 43%, based on 134 reviews, with an average rating of 5.60/10. The website's critical consensus reads: "Though it has an excellent cast, this emotionally detached movie is the kind that one admires more than enjoys." On Metacritic, the film has a weighted average score of 60 out of 100, based on 34 critics, indicating "mixed or average reviews".

According to Roger Ebert, writing in the Chicago Sun-Times, it "doesn't feel bound by the usual formulas of crime movies. What eventually happens will emerge from the personalities of the characters, not from the requirements of Hollywood endings." Peter Travers of Rolling Stone wrote, "The pleasures of this endeavor, directed with a keen eye for detail by Pieter Jan Brugge, come from what the actors bring to the material."

Ty Burr, in the Boston Globe, felt that the film had a "lack of emotion" and "could have been more than it is".  M. Torreiro, in the Spanish newspaper El País, described the film a "tense thriller, cramped and made of downtime and sensations on the limit, a strange film."

References

External links

2004 films
2004 crime drama films
2004 directorial debut films
Adultery in films
American crime drama films
Fictional portrayals of the Pittsburgh Bureau of Police
Films about kidnapping
Films scored by Craig Armstrong (composer)
Films set in forests
Films set in Pennsylvania
Films set in Pittsburgh
Films shot in North Carolina
Films with screenplays by Justin Haythe
Fox Searchlight Pictures films
English-language German films
German crime drama films
2000s English-language films
2000s American films
2000s German films